KKCN (103.1 FM, "Kickin' Country 103.1") is a radio station that serves the San Angelo, Texas, area with Texas/Red Dirt Country music. The station is owned by Townsquare Media. The station's studio is located on South Abe Street, south of downtown San Angelo, and the transmitter is northeast of Miles in southwestern Runnels County.

History
The Central West Broadcasting company put KCWB on air in 1977. The callsign changed to KRUN-FM on May 18, 1980, to KCSE in 1996, and to the current KKCN in 1999.

External links
Kickin' Country 103.1 KKCN official website

Country radio stations in the United States
KCN
Townsquare Media radio stations